Société des Eaux de Marseille is a French water distribution company in Marseille and sixty districts throughout Provence. It is a subsidiary of Veolia.

History
On October 28, 1938, a department store on the Canebière caught fire. When firefighters did not have access to sufficient amounts of water to stop the fire and two hundred casualties died, and the mayor, Henri Tasso, was dismissed and plans to buy new water pipes were made. The Société d'Etudes des Eaux de Marseille was then established.

Three years later, in 1941, the Société des Eaux de Marseille was established, and the City of Marseille signed a contract giving it water rights two years later, on March 1, 1943. In 1960, the contract was extended, making it more encompassing. It later became a subsidiary of Veolia. It has served Marseille and 60 districts in Provence for sixty years. It is a member of the World Water Council.

It is headquartered at 25 rue Edouard Delanglade in Marseille. Its president is Loic Fauchon.

References

External links
Official website

Water companies of France
Companies based in Marseille
Veolia